Milton of Campsie railway station served the village of Milton of Campsie, in the historical county of Stirlingshire, Scotland, from 1848 to 1951 on the Campsie Branch.

History 
The station was opened as Miltown on 5 July 1848 by the Edinburgh and Glasgow Railway. To the east was a siding that served a loading bank, near this was the signal box and on the eastbound platform was the station building. To the west was a siding that served Lillyburn Printworks and to the south was a siding that served Kincaid Printworks. The station's name was changed to Milton in 1874 and changed again to Milton in Campsie on 1 May 1912. It closed on 1 October 1951.

References 

Disused railway stations in East Dunbartonshire
Railway stations in Great Britain opened in 1848
Railway stations in Great Britain closed in 1951
1848 establishments in Scotland
1951 disestablishments in Scotland